Uday B. Desai is an Indian academician and the founding director of Indian Institute of Technology Hyderabad. He is a Professor Emeritus in Electrical engineering Chancellor ICFAI Dehradun, Chancellor Anurag University, Hyderabad
Honorary Distinguished Professor Plaksha University and a Strategic Consultant for TSDSI (Telecom Standards Development Society of India). He served as the director of IIT Hyderabad from June 2009 to July 2019, and is credited for taking it to rank among the top 10 engineering colleges in India in the NIRF engineering ranking. He was mentor director of IIT Bhilai from May 2016 to February 2017 and mentor director for IIIT Chittoor 2013–2018.

Early life
Uday Desai received his B.Tech. degree from IIT Kanpur in 1974, did his M.S. from the State University of New York, Buffalo in 1976, and Ph.D. from Johns Hopkins University, Baltimore, U.S.A. in 1979, all in electrical engineering.

Career
From 1979 to 1984 he was an assistant professor in the School of Electrical Engineering and Computer Science Department at Washington State University, Pullman, WA, U.S.A., and an associate professor at the same university from 1984 to 1987.

IIT Bombay
From 1987 to May 2009 he was a professor in the Electrical Engineering Department at the Indian Institute of Technology Bombay. He was dean of students at IIT-Bombay from August 2000 to July 2002. He has held visiting associate professor's position at Arizona State University, Purdue University, and Stanford University. He was a visiting professor at EPFL, Lausanne during the summer of 2002. From July 2002 to June 2004 he was the Director of HP-IITM R and D Lab. at IIT Madras.

Academic interests
His research interest is in Cyber physical systems, AI, Internet of things, wireless communication, and statistical signal processing. He has been a coauthor of 9 research monographs, author of an edited book, and author / co-author of nearly 300 peered reviewed papers in international journals and conferences.

IIT Hyderabad 
He was the director of IIT Hyderabad from June 2009 to July 2019. In his tenure, the institute was ranked in the top 10 in NIRF engineering ranking for four consecutive years. He focused more on research and innovation at IITH. He also focused on building a world class campus in collaboration with Japan. As an example please see 
 https://www.youtube.com/watch?v=vBulp-_BMuU&t=5s .

Awards and honors 

 Outstanding Alumni award from University of Buffalo in 2015
 Distinguished Alumni Award from IIT Kanpur in 2016
 Fellow of Indian National Science Academy (INSA)
 Fellow of Indian National Academy of Engineering (INAE)
 Fellow of The Institution of Electronic & Telecommunication Engineers (IETE)
 Senior Member of IEEE
 Recipient of J C Bose Fellowship
 Excellence in Teaching Award from IIT Bombay for 2007

He was on the board of Tata Communications Limited. He is a member on various boards and governing councils of several academic institutions and organizations. He is on the board of Talent Sprint an NSE company. He is one of the founding members of COMSNETS and also Society for Cancer Research and Communication. He was the chair for IEEE Bombay Section 2006–2008. He was also on the Visitation Panel for University of Ghana.

Interests
  Cyber Physical Systems
  AI
  Wireless Communication
 Signal processing
 Wireless Sensor Networks
 Adaptive signal processing
 Information and Communication Technology for Socioeconomic Development
 Image Processing and Computer Vision
 Wavelets and Multiresolution analysis
 Artificial neural networks
 Biomedical Signal and Image Processing

Fellowships

 Fellow, Indian National Science Academy (2005) 
 Fellow, Indian National Academy of Engineering 
 Recipient of J. C. Bose Fellowship
 Fellow, Institution of Electronics and Telecommunication Engineers

References

External links
 Page at IIT Hyderabad website 

Indian electrical engineers
Living people
Indian Institute of Technology directors
IIT Kanpur alumni
Fellows of the Indian National Science Academy
Year of birth missing (living people)
University at Buffalo alumni